James Cullingham Ph.D (born March 5, 1954) is a documentary filmmaker, historian and journalist with Tamarack Productions based in Nogojiwanong – Peterborough. His documentaries concerning social justice, history and popular culture have been screened around the world. Cullingham was an executive producer with CBC Radio and has been published by Canada’s leading newspapers and magazines.

James received his doctorate in Canadian and Latin American History from Toronto’s York University in 2014. He was a coordinator of the Journalism programme and professor of Journalism and English at and Liberal Studies at Seneca@York 2002-2018. He is an Adjunct Graduate Faculty Member in Canadian Studies and Indigenous Studies and the PhD program in Canadian Studies at Trent University. Cullingham is also an Instructor at Trent’s Chanie Wenjack School for Indigenous Studies.

In 1989 Cullingham formed Tamarack Productions to produce Canada's first national documentary series on Aboriginal issues featuring the work of Indigenous and non Indigenous filmmakers. Since then Cullingham has made documentaries in Canada, the United States, Europe, Africa, the Middle East and Pakistan. His films on history, politics, popular culture and social justice have been screened around the world. Cullingham has been published by Canada's leading newspapers and magazines.

Cullingham has a doctorate in History specializing in Canada and Latin America from York University in Toronto.

In January 2022, Cullingham released his transnational work of history ‘Two Dead White Men - Duncan Campbell Scott, Jacques Soustelle, and the Failure of Indigenous Policy’.

In addition to English, Cullingham speaks French fluently and has a working knowledge of Spanish.

James Cullingham is a member of the Documentary Organization of Canada. He is a past National Board Member of the Canadian Association of Journalists.

Tamarack Productions 
Tamarack Productions is a media production company that Cullingham launched in 1989, releasing its first productions in 1991, As Long as the Rivers Flow,[1] a 5-part documentary series on Aboriginal rights in Canada which has been broadcast and distributed globally in English and French (Tant que coulent les rivières.) Since that time, Tamarack has made films in several countries on themes addressing history, politics, popular culture and social justice.

In 2102, Tamarack released In Search of Blind Joe Death: The Saga of John Fahey in 2012, a documentary that follows the life and legacy of American guitarist, composer, writer and iconoclast, John Fahey. The documentary was directed, produced and executive produced by Cullingham, and has been screened around the world with much praise.

In 2018, Tamarack Productions released Jim Galloway - A Journey in Jazz , a documentary that chronicles the extraordinary career of the Scots Canadian saxophonist, journalist and impresario Galloway (1936-2014.) Cullingham directed and produced the film which had its World Premiere at the 2018 Toronto Jazz Festival and its UK premiere at the 2019 Glasgow Film Festival.

In November 2021 Cullingham released the documentary film ‘The Cost of Freedom - Refugee Journalists in Canada’ confronting one of the most compelling human rights challenges of our day: the threat to journalists. Focusing on the lives of Abdulrahman Matar from Syria, Luis Nájera of México and Arzu Yildiz from Turkey this documentary film investigates why they fled their countries and are seeking to rebuild their lives as refugees in Canada.

Selected filmography 
The Cost of Freedom - Refugee Journalists in Canada Released: fall 2021 in association with Paradigm Pictures. Director, producer, writer, co-executive producer
Jim Galloway - A Journey in Jazz Released: June 2018 Director, producer, writer, co-executive producer
The Pass System (2015), executive producer
In Search of Blind Joe Death: The Saga of John Fahey
Released: Oct. 2012
Director, Producer, Executive producer 
Dishonour Defied
Released: 2007
Directed by: Azara Rashid
Executive Producer, Producer
Lessons In Fear  
Released: 2005
Director, Producer
We Have Such Things At Home
Released: October 1997
Director, Producer
Duncan Campbell Scott: The Poet and The Indians
Released: 1994
Director, Producer

Selected radio productions 

Education on the West Bank 
CBC Radio One 
June 2005

Lessons in Loathing 
CBC Radio One
April 2004

Nisga'a and the BC Election 
CBC Radio National Network 
May 1996

The Comeback of Howie Morenz 
CBC Radio/National Syndication/ Satire Series 
Written by: Roy McGregor 
Performed by: Booth Savage

Confessions of a Dead Head 
Prime Time, CBC Radio
June 1992

A Forgotten Frontier, Aboriginal Rights in B.C.
CBC Radio
January 1986

The Ghost of Busher Jackson 
CBC Radio
March 1986

Broadcast - journalism career 
Cullingham’s career in Journalism began in 1983 as a producer, documentarian and line-up editor for Sunday Morning at CBC Radio. He was promoted  in 1985 to Desk Producer, and was moved to Producer of Morningside for CBC Radio in 1986. That same year, he became Senior Producer of As It Happens (CBC Radio). In 1987, Cullingham moved to Executive Producer of As It Happens until 1989, when he returned to Sunday Morning (CBC Radio), becoming an Executive Producer until 1990.

In 1989, Cullingham created Tamarack Productions, producing its first project, As Long As The Rivers Flow, in 1991. The television series focuses on Aboriginal rights in Canada, in both modern and historical times, and was broken up into five one-hour episodes - Flooding in Job’s Garden, The Learning Path, Starting Fire with Gunpowder, Tikinagan and Time Immemorial. The series brought together notable directors in this subject area in Canada including Hugh Brody, Gil Cardinal, Boyce Richardson and Loretta Todd. Peter Raymont of White Pine Pictures was series Executive Producer.

Cullingham returned to CBC in 1997 to work as a Producer for Canada: A People’s History. He stayed there until 2000, and moved to VisionTV Insight as a Supervising Producer and Story Editor.

In 2002, Cullingham began his career as a Broadcast-Journalism professor at Seneca College, Seneca@York in Toronto. He was the Journalism program coordinator from 2004 to 2011. Cullingham currently teaches documentary courses in the Journalism program, along with History in English and Liberal Studies program.

Cullingham has done guest lectures and screenings  at a number of universities including Concordia University, Queen's University, the University of Western Ontario, University of Toronto, York University, l’École normale supérieure and EFAP Images et médias in Paris. He conducts documentary master classes at EFAP annually.

Print-journalism 
Cullingham contributes frequently to publications including the Toronto Star, The Globe and Mail and the Journal of Wildlife Culture. He began writing in 1984 for various publications such as Aboriginal Voices, Maclean’s, MOJO, NOW Magazine, Ontario Indian, Pollution Probe, Saturday Night and Bulletin of Latin American Studies.

His publications include articles concerning Aboriginal rights in Canada, Canadian Politics, sports and a variety of others.

Education 
Cullingham was born and raised in Toronto, Ontario. As a youth he also resided in Florida and Switzerland where he completed his high school studies. 
 2014 - received History PhD from York University with his dissertation: "Scars of Empire: A Juxtaposition of Duncan Campbell Scott and Jacques Soustelle." 
 2008 - doctoral research at the L'Université de Paris Sorbonne 
 2005 - received Master of Arts degree in History at the University of Toronto, began PhD in History at York University
 1980 - graduated Trent University in Peterborough, Ontario, with an Honours B.A. in Native Studies and French

Selected awards 
 Worldfest- Houston International Film Festival - Silver Remi Winner for In Search of Blind Joe Death: The Saga of John Fahey - Houston, Texas, 2013. 
 International Wildlife Film Festival -  Top prize for Film Dealing with Aboriginal Peoples; Awards of Merit for Balanced Presentation of a Controversial Subject and Script - Missoula, Montana, 1995. 
 American Indian Film Festival - Producers Award, Tamarack Productions - San Francisco, 1991. 
 Nyon International Documentary Film Festival (Switzerland) - Director: Gill Cardinal - The People's Jury Award - Tikinagan, 1991.
 Two Rivers Native Film and Video Festival - "New Visionary" Awards to directors Gil Cardinal, David Poisey and Loretta Todd for their films in As Long As The Rivers Flow - Minneapolis, 1991.

References

External links
 

1954 births
Living people
Canadian radio producers
Canadian Broadcasting Corporation people
Canadian documentary film producers
People from Toronto
University of Toronto alumni
Journalism teachers
Academic staff of Seneca College